Catacombs is a 2007 American horror film directed by Tomm Coker and David Elliot and starring Shannyn Sossamon and Alecia Moore. The plot follows a young woman attempting to find her way out of the Catacombs of Paris with a killer pursuing her.

It is the first original film from FEARnet, collaborating with Lions Gate Entertainment was released on October 7, 2007. The film's soundtrack was composed by Yoshiki, including the theme song "Blue Butterfly" written by Yoshiki and performed by Violet UK.

Plot
Victoria, an anxiety-ridden young woman, receives an invitation from her sister Carolyn. The first line of the film is a voice-over: "My sister sent me a postcard, all it said was 'Come to Paris. It'll be good for you.' 48 hours after I arrived, she and everyone I'd met were dead."

Victoria arrives in Paris and Carolyn takes her home, where one of Carolyn's friends scares her with a mask. After settling in, the sisters' tour Paris and shop. During a break, Carolyn tells Victoria about a secret rave in the Catacombs of Paris that night.  There is a long line of people at the catacombs, but Carolyn is friends with the bouncer and they are allowed in without waiting. Victoria is given a flashlight and follows Carolyn to the rave, where they arrive to hear an introduction by host Jean-Michel. During the rave, Victoria begins to have an anxiety attack and needs water for her medication. Jean-Michel escorts her to the private VIP area of the party, where they find Carolyn and a group of friends.

Jean-Michel pours Victoria a large glass of absinthe and tells her of a killer living in the catacombs. Raised by a Satanic Cult, the killer, "Antichrist," feeds on people who get lost in the Catacombs. Most of the group dismisses the story as a myth and they decide to go skinny dipping. Victoria declines to join them and becomes lost as she heads back to the rave. She is joined by Carolyn, and as the sisters attempt to find their way back, someone grabs Carolyn and drags her off into the darkness. Victoria finds Carolyn dead and panics. A man in a goat mask begins to chase her, and she finds shelter hiding in a storage room. When the man arrives and starts a generator, it appears that the storage room is his home. Victoria escapes and runs back toward the crowd.

She has scarcely returned when the Prefecture of Police burst in and interrupt the rave. Victoria is caught up in a mob and hits her head, and when she regains consciousness she is alone in the catacombs. She encounters a man named Henri who tries to help her, but every exit they come to is blocked. Henri falls through a rotted walkway while they are searching for a way out and injures his leg. Victoria tries to help him, but eventually gives up; she takes his map and leaves him in the dark, striking out on her own. When she finds an exit she is frightened by someone on the other side trying to get in, and she flees, fearing it is the Antichrist. After a chase through the tunnels, she hides behind a wall column, armed with a mining pick. When the pursuer approaches, she strikes out blindly with the pick and hits him.

Shortly after, Carolyn and her friends show up and tell Victoria that it was all just a prank. They wonder why Victoria is crying until they notice Jean-Michel lying dead, felled by the blow of Victoria's pick. Carolyn severely scolds Victoria, who then kills the former and her remaining friends out of spite. Escaping at last from the catacombs, Victoria returns to the airport in a taxi and repeats the voice-over line which started the film.

Cast
Shannyn Sossamon as Victoria
Pink (singer) as Carolyn  
Emil Hostina as Henry
Sandi Dragoi as Llaves
Mihai Stanescu as Jean Michele
Cabral Ibacka as Hugo
Radu Andrei Micu as Nico
Cain Manoli as Leon

Production
Though exterior shots of Paris were shot on location, most of Catacombs was filmed in Bucharest, Romania. Reconstructions of the actual Paris Catacombs were built on a soundstage where the bulk of the film was shot.

Release
Catacombs premiered on FEARnet On Demand on October 1, 2007.

See also
 FEARnet
 Catacombs of Paris

References

External links
 
 
 
 Catacombs Official Site (Japanese)

2007 films
2007 horror films
American horror films
Films about pranks
Films about sisters
Films set in Paris
Films shot in Paris
Films shot in Bucharest
Lionsgate films
Murder in films
Sororicide in fiction
Films set in subterranea
2000s English-language films
2000s American films